The Tonga national football team represents Tonga in men's international football and is controlled by the Tonga Football Association, which is a part of the Oceania Football Confederation.

History

Information

Football in Tonga
Tonga's greatest football triumph to date was their triumph in the first ever Polynesian Cup held in 1993 over Samoa and the Cook Islands. Although local players have not yet made their mark on big leagues abroad, the Chief Executive of the Tonga Football Association, Joe Topou, was appointed to the FIFA Executive Committee in 2002.

The second Goal project
Tonga's second Goal project will develop and improve the national football academy and the association's headquarters in Atele, Tongatapu, which was built in the country's first Goal project. This development work has the aim that all of the Tonga Football Association's needs are fully satisfied. Local matches will be held at the football academy, while the administration's requirements, including the needs of players, officials and spectators, will also be covered. The football school will be transformed into a House of Football.

Team image

Kit sponsorship

Fixtures and results

Following their withdrawal from qualifying for the 2022 FIFA World Cup due to the 2022 Hunga Tonga–Hunga Ha'apai eruption and tsunami, Tonga have no matches scheduled. The team last competed at the 2019 Pacific Games.

Current squad
The following players were called up for the 2019 Pacific Games.

Caps and goals updated as of 18 July 2019, after the game against Papua New Guinea.

Player records

Players in bold are still active with Tonga.

Most capped players

Top goalscorers

Coaching staff

Coaching history

  Tongia Nāpa'a (1979)
  Rudi Gutendorf (1981)
  Umberto Mottini (1997–1998)
  Gary Phillips (2001)
  Heinave Kaifa (2002–2003)
  Milan Janković (2003–2005)
  Ben Perry (2005–2006)
  Reece McLaughlin (2006–2007)
  Chris Williams (2011)
  Timote Moleni (2015–present)

Competitive record

World Cup

OFC Nations Cup

Pacific Games

Pacific Mini Games

Polynesia Cup

Head-to-head record

See also
 Tonga national under-23 football team
 Tonga national under-20 football team
 Tonga national under-17 football team
 Tonga women's national football team
 Tonga women's national under-20 football team

References

 
Oceanian national association football teams